Stephen Jeffery Netburn (born July 12, 1943) is an American fencer.

He graduated from the University of Pennsylvania in 1965, after transferring from New York University. He was US Épée Champion in 1969. In 1971 Netburn won gold medals in both individual and team épée at the Pan American Games. He competed in the individual and team épée events at the 1968 and 1972 Summer Olympics.

Netburn later worked as a banker.

References

External links
 

1943 births
Living people
American male épée fencers
Olympic fencers of the United States
Fencers at the 1968 Summer Olympics
Fencers at the 1972 Summer Olympics
Sportspeople from New York (state)
Pan American Games medalists in fencing
Pan American Games gold medalists for the United States
Fencers at the 1971 Pan American Games
Medalists at the 1971 Pan American Games